The Botniaring is a racing circuit situated in Southern Ostrobothnia, Jurva, Finland. The track is mostly used for
national races but in the last years there has been also arranged NEZ (North European Zone) races.

The circuit hosted the Legends World Course Road Finals in 2017.

Lap records

The fastest official race lap records at the Botniaring Racing Circuit are listed as:

References

External links 
Official website

Motorsport venues in Finland
Buildings and structures in South Ostrobothnia